RS-280 is a 5-6 crew sports sailing yacht created and made in Kaunas,  Lithuania. Founders of class are Raimondas Šiugždinis and Saulius Pajarskas. It is the fastest and the most maneuverable yacht class created in Lithuania.

Specifications 
Length: 8,30 m
Weight: 1800 kg
Width: 2,74 m
Crew: 5-6 
Speed: 11 knots

External links 
Official website

Dinghies
Sailing in Lithuania